Perkupa is a village in Borsod-Abaúj-Zemplén county, Hungary.

Names and etymology
The name is of Slavic origin: prěkopa or priekopa 'ditch'. There are several villages in Slovakia with similar names (e.g. Priekopa, Sobrance District). 1332—1335 de Precupa. The name of the part Dobódél comes from the name of Dubodiel (Trenčín District).

References

External links 
 Street map 

Populated places in Borsod-Abaúj-Zemplén County